Bohuslavka is a village in Izium Raion (district) in Kharkiv Oblast of  eastern Ukraine, at about  east-southeast (ESE) from the centre of Kharkiv city. It is the administrative centre of the Boguslavka village council, which also includes the villages of Zagrizove, Lozova and Nova Kruhliakivka. The village is on the left (eastern) bank of the Oskil Reservoir.

The settlement came under attack by Russian forces in 2022, during the Russian invasion of Ukraine and was regained by Ukrainian forces by the beginning of October the same year.

References

Villages in Izium Raion